Baitun Nur (also spelled Baitunnur or Baitun Noor) (Arabic for "House of Light") is an Ahmadiyya mosque in Calgary, Alberta.  
Baitun Nur is the largest mosque in Canada.

Public opening 

The cornerstone of the mosque was laid in 2005. Construction was completed in 2008 at an estimated self-funded cost of C$15 million, with roughly C$8 million coming from the approximately 3,000 local Ahmadi Muslims.

5,000 people attended Baitun Nur's grand opening on July 5, 2008, including dignitaries such as Canadian Prime Minister Stephen Harper, Opposition Leader Stéphane Dion, and Calgary Mayor Dave Bronconnier.
The Roman Catholic Bishop of Calgary, Fred Henry, also attended.
Mirza Masroor Ahmad, the supreme head of the worldwide Ahmadiyya Muslim Community, oversaw the opening.

While members of various faiths were invited, the Sunni Muslim group Islamic Supreme Council of Canada, led by Syed Soharwardy, was not invited, due to its belief that Ahmadiyya Muslims are not real Muslims, and because it did not consider Baitun Nur a mosque.

At the opening, Prime Minister Harper said "Calgarians, Albertans and Canadians will see the moderate, benevolent face of Islam in this mosque and the people who worship here." Afterward, a governing party insider said "It's an important signal the prime minister is sending, not just to militant Islamists abroad, but to their sympathizers here at home, that he's perfectly prepared to ignore them and side with persecuted minorities within the faith."

Mosque complex 

Baitun Nur is located in the Castleridge community of Calgary.

A   steel-capped minaret tower and large steel dome are its most prominent external features.

Around the exterior of the building are written 99 Arabic words, each an attribute of Allah's character as stated in the Qur'an.

In addition to serving as a place of worship, the mosque complex includes classrooms, office space, a children's area, a kitchen and a community centre.
In the prayer hall of the mosque hangs a 400-kilogram chandelier that cost $50,000.

Baitun Nur was designed by Naseer Ahmad and Manu Chugh Architects; it was the seventh Ahmadiyya mosque designed by Ahmad.

See also

List of mosques in Canada
 List of mosques in the Americas
 Lists of mosques

References

External links 

 Official site of Baitunnur Mosque

Ahmadiyya mosques in Canada
Religious buildings and structures in Calgary
Mosques completed in 2008
Mosques in Alberta
21st-century religious buildings and structures in Canada